American Routes is a weekly two-hour public radio program that presents the breadth and depth of the American musical and cultural landscape. Hosted by Nick Spitzer, American Routes is syndicated by 225 stations, with over half a million listeners. It is produced out of New Orleans and distributed by PRX. American Routes is the most widely heard regular presence for tradition-derived and community-based music on public radio today.

History

The show was launched in November 1997 on WWOZ in New Orleans. It was created by Nick Spitzer and Mary Beth Kirchner, who had worked together previously producing segments for All Things Considered. By 1998, American Routes was syndicated by American Public Radio for 39 stations.

In the wake of Hurricane Katrina, production of the show temporarily relocated to KRVS 88.7 FM at the University of Louisiana at Lafayette in Lafayette, Louisiana.   While in Lafayette, Spitzer and his crew produced a series of shows called "After the Storm," which "followed the rebuilding of the Gulf Coast through the stories and songs of its musicians." 

Production operations have since returned to New Orleans with studios now at Tulane University. In July 2008, American Routes announced an affiliation with Tulane.

American Routes celebrated its 10th anniversary on January 16, 2009, with a concert at the House of Blues in New Orleans. Performers included Dr. Michael White, Trombone Shorty and Al Johnson. Performances and interviews from the show were included in a program that aired the week of February 18, 2009.

American Routes has more than 300 original shows in its catalog, and a database of over 1000 hours of interviews.

As of July 6, the program will switch distributors from APM to the Public Radio Exchange, although it will continue to be distributed on the public radio satellite system.  It is the second major public radio series to switch to the web-based distributor from one of the "Big 3" public radio distributors, after Sound Opinions switched from APM last year.

Format
Every American Routes show is two hours long. The show consists of songs arranged around interviews, usually of musicians or field audio from various cultural events or institutions. The music is chosen to complement the theme of the show. You can find archived radio shows featuring playlists of specific artists and styles to choose from, streaming 24/7 at American Routes

The host

Nick Spitzer has hosted the public radio show American Routes since its 1997 premiere. He was Louisiana's first State Folklorist, and the founding director of the Louisiana Folklife Program. He has also been the senior folklife specialist at the Smithsonian Institution, and a commentator and producer for NPR, CBS and ABC. 

Nick Spitzer is the editor and co-writer of numerous books, including Public Folklore and Blues for New Orleans: Mardi Gras and America’s Creole Soul. He was named the Louisiana Humanist of the Year in 2006 for his work towards cultural recovery after Hurricane Katrina. He is currently a professor of Anthropology and American Studies at Tulane University.

Interviews

Notable interviews featured on American Routes include: 

 
Joan Baez
Chuck Berry
Ray Charles
Dr John
 
Al Green
Buddy Guy
Herbie Hancock
Jim Jarmusch
 
Norah Jones
Spike Lee
Jerry Lee Lewis
Taj Mahal
 
Hugh Masekela
Willie Nelson
Dolly Parton
Bonnie Raitt
 
Anne Rice
Sonny Rollins
Pete Seeger
Allen Toussaint
 
Porter Wagoner
Tom Waits
Wilco
Brian Wilson

Staff
As of April 2018:
Nick Spitzer – Host and Producer
Mary Beth Kirchner – Founding Executive Producer
Betsy Shepherd – Managing Producer & Editor
Garrett Pittman – Associate Producer
Olivia Broslawsky – Assistant Producer
Jason Rhein – Technical Supervisor
Lauren Callihan — Development Associate

CD releases
American Routes with Nick Spitzer: Songs and Stories from the Road [2 CD] (2008, Highbridge Company)
Our New Orleans: A Benefit Album [CD] (2005, Nonesuch Records)

External links
American Routes
American Routes via streaming audio

References

American Public Media programs
American music radio programs
1998 radio programme debuts